Warsaw was the planned debut album by the English post-punk band Joy Division, while they were briefly associated with RCA Records. Recorded in May 1978, it comprised eleven tracks now known collectively as the "RCA Sessions". However, the band were disappointed with the label's post-production work and the deal fell through, the album being scrapped.

Four of the songs recorded during the RCA sessions had previously been recorded at the end of 1977, and it was these older recordings that the band would release the following month as their debut An Ideal for Living EP.

The RCA sessions circulated on bootlegs for years, generally bearing the Warsaw title, until the tracks were licensed for a commercial release in 1994, appearing alongside "As You Said" from the 1980 "Komakino" single, as well as the band's first recorded music, the five "Warsaw Demo" tracks from 1977, which were noted on the sleeve as "bonus tracks".

Track listing
All tracks written by Warsaw/Joy Division.

The RCA Sessions

"The Drawback" – 1:42 later released on Heart and Soul
"Leaders of Men" – 2:28
"Walked in Line" – 2:50
"Failures" – 2:22
"Novelty" – 3:36
"No Love Lost" – 4:34
"Transmission" – 4:20
"Living in the Ice Age" – 2:19
"Interzone" – 2:02 later released on Heart and Soul
"Warsaw" – 2:06
"Shadowplay" – 3:53 later released on Heart and Soul

From "Komakino"

 "As You Said" – 2:01 originally released on the "Komakino" single

The Warsaw Demo

 "Inside the Line" – 2:43
 "Gutz" – 1:59
 "At a Later Date" – 3:14
 "The Kill" – 2:08
 "You're No Good for Me" – 2:03

Notes
Tracks 1–11 recorded at Arrow Studios, Manchester, 3–4 May 1978
Track 12 recorded at Britannia Row Studios, Islington, London, March 1980
Tracks 13–17 recorded at Pennine Sound Studios, Manchester, 18 July 1977

References

Joy Division compilation albums
1994 compilation albums